Auxolophotis is a genus of moths of the family Crambidae.

Species
Auxolophotis cosmophilopis (Meyrick, 1934)
Auxolophotis ioxanthias Meyrick, 1933

References

Pyraustinae
Crambidae genera
Taxa named by Edward Meyrick